Chattambikkavala is a 1969 Indian Malayalam-language crime thriller film, directed by N. Sankaran Nair and written by Muttathu Varkey. The film stars Sathyan, Srividya, Adoor Bhasi and Thikkurissy Sukumaran Nair. It is based on Muttathu Varkey's novel of the same name.

Plot

Cast 
Sathyan as John Joseph
Srividya as Suzy
Thikkurissy Sukumaran Nair as Mathachan
Jose Prakash as Man at beach
K. V. Shanthi as Thresya
Bahadoor as Pannan
K. P. Ummer as Cheriyan
Meena as Rosamma
S. P. Pillai as Ponnan

Soundtrack 
The music was composed by B. A. Chidambaranath and the lyrics were written by O. N. V. Kurup.

References

External links 
 

1960s crime thriller films
1960s Malayalam-language films
1969 films
Films based on Indian novels
Films directed by N. Sankaran Nair
Indian crime thriller films